Christopher Salmon Patterson (January 16, 1823 – July 24, 1893) was a Canadian Puisne judge of the Supreme Court of Canada.

Born in London, England, the son of John and Ann Patterson, he studied at the Royal Belfast Academical Institution in Ireland. In 1845, he emigrated to Picton, Canada West (now Ontario), Canada. He was called to the Canada West Bar in 1851 and moved to Toronto in 1856 and practised law. In 1874, he was appointed to the Ontario Court of Error and Appeal.  In 1888, he was appointed to the Supreme Court of Canada in 1888. He served until his death in 1893.

Patterson Township, Ontario is named in his honour.

References
 Supreme Court of Canada Biography

1823 births
1893 deaths
English emigrants to pre-Confederation Ontario
Justices of the Supreme Court of Canada
People educated at the Royal Belfast Academical Institution
Immigrants to the Province of Canada